Brace Bridge railway station is a Kolkata Suburban Railway station on the Budge Budge Branch line. It is under the jurisdiction of the Sealdah railway division in the Eastern Railway zone of the Indian Railways. It serves Parnasree Pally area in Kolkata in the Indian state of West Bengal.

History

Electrification

Station complex
The platform is well sheltered. The station possesses many facilities including water and sanitation. There is a proper approach road to this station.

References

Railway stations in Kolkata
Sealdah railway division
Kolkata Suburban Railway stations
Railway stations in India opened in 1890
1890 establishments in the British Empire